The Santa Fe Watershed Association is a non-profit organization based in Santa Fe, New Mexico.  The mission of the Santa Fe Watershed Association is to return the Santa Fe River to a living river, from its beginning at Lake Peak to its final outfall at the Rio Grande, balancing human uses with natural resource protection and restoring the heart to the Santa Fe community.  The organization sponsors activities such as river cleanups, adoption of stretches of the river, and educational talks pertaining to the river.

External links
Santa Fe Watershed Association

Water organizations in the United States
Non-profit organizations based in New Mexico
Rio Grande basin
Watersheds of the United States